In measure theory, Lebesgue's dominated convergence theorem provides sufficient conditions under which almost everywhere convergence of a sequence of functions implies convergence in the L1 norm. Its power and utility are two of the primary theoretical advantages of Lebesgue integration over Riemann integration.

In addition to its frequent appearance in mathematical analysis and partial differential equations, it is widely used in probability theory, since it gives a sufficient condition for the convergence of expected values of random variables.

Statement
Lebesgue's dominated convergence theorem. Let  be a sequence of complex-valued measurable functions on a measure space . Suppose that the sequence converges pointwise to a function  and is dominated by some integrable function  in the sense that
 
for all numbers n in the index set of the sequence and all points .
Then f is integrable (in the Lebesgue sense) and
 
which also implies

Remark 1. The statement "g is integrable" means that measurable function  is Lebesgue integrable; i.e.

Remark 2. (These precautions are necessary, because otherwise there might exist a non-measurable subset of a  set , hence  might not be measurable.)

Remark 3. If , the condition that there is a dominating integrable function  can be relaxed to uniform integrability of the sequence (fn), see Vitali convergence theorem.

Remark 4. While  is Lebesgue integrable, it is not in general Riemann integrable.

Proof
Without loss of generality, one can assume that f is real, because one can split f into its real and imaginary parts (remember that a sequence of complex numbers converges if and only if both its real and imaginary counterparts converge) and apply the triangle inequality at the end.

Lebesgue's dominated convergence theorem is a special case of the Fatou–Lebesgue theorem. Below, however, is a direct proof that uses Fatou’s lemma as the essential tool.

Since f is the pointwise limit of the sequence (fn) of measurable functions that are dominated by g, it is also measurable and dominated by g, hence it is integrable. Furthermore, (these will be needed later),
 
for all n and
 
The second of these is trivially true (by the very definition of f). Using linearity and monotonicity of the Lebesgue integral,
 
By the reverse Fatou lemma (it is here that we use the fact that |f−fn| is bounded above by an integrable function)
 
which implies that the limit exists and vanishes i.e.
 
Finally, since
 
we have that
 
The theorem now follows.

The values of these integrals are not influenced by these changes to the integrands on this μ-null set N, so the theorem continues to hold.

DCT holds even if fn converges to f in measure (finite measure) and the dominating function is non-negative almost everywhere.

Discussion of the assumptions
The assumption that the sequence is dominated by some integrable g cannot be dispensed with. This may be seen as follows: define  for x in the interval  and  otherwise. Any g which dominates the sequence must also dominate the pointwise supremum . Observe that
 
by the divergence of the harmonic series. Hence, the monotonicity of the Lebesgue integral tells us that there exists no integrable function which dominates the sequence on [0,1]. A direct calculation shows that integration and pointwise limit do not commute for this sequence:
 
because the pointwise limit of the sequence is the zero function. Note that the sequence (fn) is not even uniformly integrable, hence also the Vitali convergence theorem is not applicable.

Bounded convergence theorem
One corollary to the dominated convergence theorem is the bounded convergence theorem, which states that if (fn) is a sequence of uniformly bounded complex-valued measurable functions which converges pointwise on a bounded measure space  (i.e. one in which μ(S) is finite) to a function f, then the limit f is an integrable function and

Remark: The pointwise convergence and uniform boundedness of the sequence can be relaxed to hold only almost everywhere, provided the measure space  is complete or f is chosen as a measurable function which agrees μ-almost everywhere with the  everywhere existing pointwise limit.

Proof
Since the sequence is uniformly bounded, there is a real number M such that  for all  and for all n. Define  for all . Then the sequence is dominated by g. Furthermore, g is integrable since it is a constant function on a set of finite measure. Therefore, the result follows from the dominated convergence theorem.

If the assumptions hold only  everywhere, then there exists a  set  such that the functions fn1S\N satisfy the assumptions everywhere on S.

Dominated convergence in Lp-spaces (corollary)
Let  be a measure space,  a real number and  a sequence of -measurable functions .

Lp space), i.e., for every natural number  we have: , μ-almost everywhere.

Idea of the proof: Apply the original theorem to the function sequence  with the dominating function .

Extensions
The dominated convergence theorem applies also to measurable functions with values in a Banach space, with the dominating function still being non-negative and integrable as above. The assumption of convergence almost everywhere can be weakened to require only convergence in measure.

The dominated convergence theorem applies also to conditional expectations.

See also
 Convergence of random variables, Convergence in mean
 Monotone convergence theorem (does not require domination by an integrable function but assumes monotonicity of the sequence instead)
 Scheffé's lemma
 Uniform integrability
 Vitali convergence theorem (a generalization of Lebesgue's dominated convergence theorem)

Notes

References
 
 
 
 

Theorems in real analysis
Theorems in measure theory
Probability theorems
Articles containing proofs